Justice League: Battle for Metropolis is an Interactive dark ride located at several Six Flags theme parks across North America.

Riders travel through the fictional city of Metropolis aboard enhanced-motion "RTVs" designed by A.R.G.U.S., and shoot digital targets generated on large 3D screens in real-time, as well as physical targets in full practical sets. There are many special effects in the ride such as fog and fire hidden in the attraction's various scenes.

Since the original ride opened at Six Flags Over Texas on May 23, 2015, Six Flags has installed the dark ride at seven of its parks, all of which are still in operation.

History

Justice League: Alien Invasion 3D
In October 2011, the chairman and CEO of Sally Corporation, John Wood, stated they had started developing their biggest project, something which they believe would be "the top of the industry". The project was later announced to be Justice League: Alien Invasion 3D at Warner Bros. Movie World on the Gold Coast, Australia. Following the launch of the ride in September 2012, Sally Corporation expressed interest in transferring the concept to other parks around the world including those in the United States. In the United States, the Justice League brand, along with other DC Comics properties, are licensed by Six Flags.

Announcements
On August 28, 2014, Six Flags officially announced Justice League: Battle for Metropolis would be added in 2015 to Six Flags Over Texas and Six Flags St. Louis. In Six Flags Over Texas the ride would replace the Adventure Theater, while the Six Flags St. Louis attraction Scooby-Doo! Ghostblasters: The Mystery of the Scary Swamp ride would be replaced. Noticeable differences between Justice League: Alien Invasion 3D and Justice League: Battle for Metropolis include a motion-based ride system by Oceaneering International and the involvement of different DC Comics villains, Lex Luthor and The Joker, rather than Starro the Conqueror.

On September 2, 2014, in an interview with Sally Corporation CEO John Wood, new details about the attraction were released. Six Flags Over Texas received ten ride vehicles, while Six Flags St. Louis received seven. The ride features two final chase scenes, as well as eight Digital 3D Screens inside the ride that are as large as 30 feet wide.

On September 3, 2015, Six Flags announced Justice League: Battle for Metropolis would be added to Six Flags Great America and Six Flags México in 2016.

On September 1, 2016, Six Flags announced Justice League: Battle for Metropolis would be added to Six Flags Magic Mountain, Six Flags Great Adventure, and Six Flags Over Georgia in 2017. It was announced that Magic Mountain's version would have a new alternate ending and the addition of Harley Quinn, who was briefly mentioned by the Joker in all four of the original rides. The Six Flags Over Georgia version becomes part of a new Metropolis-themed section that replaced the park's Cotton States Exposition and includes the adjacent Superman Ultimate Flight roller coaster.

On November 14, 2018, it was announced that Justice League: Battle for Metropolis received the THEA Award for Outstanding Achievement (Attraction). Rich Hill, lead designer of JUSTICE LEAGUE: Battle for Metropolis and Creative Director for Sally Corporation states, “None of this would have been achieved without the super-hero team of artists, engineers and technicians Sally enlisted to complete this monumental mission.  Congratulations to everyone who helped bring this over-the-top theme park attraction to life! "This all started 5 years ago as a promise Sally made to Six Flags to bring world-class storytelling experiences to their guests.  We are overjoyed to see that the industry we love so much feels that we delivered on that promise.  We like to think that moving forward, the seven JUSTICE LEAGUE dark rides we designed and built for the Six Flags chain will set a new bar for the level of quality, excitement and fun a regional park can offer in a family attraction."

Plot
Riders enter the Hall of Justice, where they learn that Lex Luthor has branded the Justice League as lawless vigilantes. By exploiting the weaknesses of various members of the League, and hiring The Joker to distract the League, Luthor has captured Supergirl, The Flash, Green Lantern and Wonder Woman. Cyborg enlists riders into the Justice League Reserve Team and sends them out into Metropolis aboard RTVs, autonomous vehicles that will transport riders to trouble spots throughout the city, thanks to information provided by both Superman and Batman. Each rider has an EMP blaster, which will destroy inanimate objects—including robotic enemies—and also stun humans, thus scoring points.

As the RTV departs the Hall of Justice, riders pass through a cloud of blue mist, which will temporarily protect them from Joker's deadly green laughing gas. Outside S.T.A.R. Labs, Superman battles the Joker, but he is incapacitated by Lex Luthor and captured. The Joker attempts to gas the RTV, but the riders escape into Metropolis before reaching LexCorp, where Cyborg is attempting to hack the building's security systems. Batman arrives to provide cover, allowing the riders to enter LexCorp, where they are ambushed by Luthor. The RTV makes its way to the giant lab where the League members are held; as the riders work to destroy Luthor's robot sentries, Cyborg and Batman free the League. Escaping back into the city, the Justice League and the Reserve Team battle Lex Luthor, the Joker, Lexbots and their henchmen, following the pair into the city's subway system before ultimately capturing them. In appreciation for saving the city, the riders are made honorary Justice League members and are shown their scores, including the top scorer for that ride vehicle.

Special effects
The ride features multiple special effects, including complex animatronics. Throughout the ride, the trains shake, fire bursts up about 4 feet away from riders, and a shelving unit containing barrels appears to fall on riders.

Installations

Notes

References

External links
Official homepage for first installation, at Six Flags Over Texas

Amusement rides introduced in 2015
Amusement rides introduced in 2016
Amusement rides introduced in 2017
Amusement rides manufactured by Sally Corporation
Animatronic attractions
Dark rides
DC Comics in amusement parks
Justice League in other media
Sally Corporation animatronics
Six Flags attractions
Six Flags Great Adventure
Six Flags Great America
Six Flags Magic Mountain
Six Flags México
Six Flags Over Georgia
Six Flags Over Texas
Six Flags St. Louis
Warner Bros. Global Brands and Experiences attractions